Guilford Lake is a lake located by Guilford, New York. Fish species present in the lake include black crappie, brown trout, pickerel, pumpkinseed sunfish, rock bass, white sucker, yellow perch, rainbow trout, largemouth bass, and walleye. There is access via state owned carry down off County Route 35, on the southeast shore by the outlet.

References

Lakes of New York (state)
Lakes of Chenango County, New York